Light Vessel No.57 (also known as Lightship No.57 or LV57) was an American lightvessel that was built in 1891 and served on the Great Lakes (Lake Michigan), west of the Straits of Mackinac (the reef is now the site of the Grays Reef Light), from her construction to her retirement in 1924. She was partly dismantled, used as a clubhouse, and wrecked by a storm at some time after 1928. On December 16, 1996 the remains of Light Vessel No.57 were listed on the National Register of Historic Places.

History 
Light Vessel No.57 was built in 1891 in Toledo, Ohio by Craig Shipbuilding at a cost of $14,225. She was one of three federal lightvessels designed for use during the navigational season as an experiment to avoid the construction of a much more expensive permanent lighthouse. She also had a gross register tonnage of 130 tons, with a net register tonnage of 101 tons. She had two masts, with clusters of three oil-burning lens lanterns that were hoisted onto each masthead.

Due to the increased ship traffic in the area, it was decided that she would be moved to Gray's Reef to make the area safer.

Later history
Light Vessel No.57 was retired in 1923. In 1924 she was sold to the South Shore Yacht Club, Milwaukee, Wisconsin, and was no longer in the federal government's records. Later she was condemned, dismantled, and moved to Milwaukee. She lay in Norwegian Alley for several years. In 1928 Light Vessel No.57 was taken to South Shore Beach, Milwaukee and used as a clubhouse until she was wrecked by a storm several years later.

A November 28, 1926 issue of the Milwaukee Journal Sentinel reported that Light Vessel No.57 was bought by a junk dealer who "removed the pig iron and sold it with all else removable and salable."

Wreck of Light Vessel No.57

Legacy
In November 2018, the Sprecher Brewery released a beer named after Light Vessel No.57.

References

1891 ships
Shipwrecks on the National Register of Historic Places in Wisconsin
Steamships of the United States
Shipwrecks of Lake Michigan
National Register of Historic Places in Milwaukee County, Wisconsin
Shipwrecks of the Wisconsin coast
Ships built in Toledo, Ohio
Wreck diving sites in the United States